The Van Dyke House near Rivals, Kentucky was listed on the National Register of Historic Places in 1987. The county that surrounds the Van Dyke House is Spencer County.

It is a one-and-a-half-story, three-bay, dry-stone hall-parlor plan house,  in plan.  It was built of Upper Ordovician limestone. 

In the 1990s, the house was surrounded by grasslands, hundreds of trees, and a shed on the side for storage. Currently, the house is modernized and suburban-like, fitting well into the community.

References
3. https://www.spencercountyky.gov/. November, 2021. Spencer County, Kentucky
4. https://npgallery.nps.gov/AssetDetail/NRIS/87000181 National Park Gallery - Digital Asset Management System

National Register of Historic Places in Spencer County, Kentucky
Federal architecture in Kentucky
Houses on the National Register of Historic Places in Kentucky
Hall-parlor plan architecture in the United States
Stone houses in Kentucky